Per Bakken (26 October 1882 – August 1958) was a Norwegian Nordic skier who won both the Nordic combined and 50 km cross-country skiing events at the Holmenkollen ski festival in 1904. For his dual victories that year, Bakken earned the Holmenkollen medal in 1907.

References

External links
Holmenkollen medalists – click Holmenkollmedaljen for downloadable pdf file 
Holmenkollen winners since 1892 – click Vinnere for downloadable pdf file 

Holmenkollen medalists
Holmenkollen Ski Festival winners
Norwegian male cross-country skiers
Norwegian male Nordic combined skiers
1882 births
1958 deaths
20th-century Norwegian people